This is a list of the National Register of Historic Places listings in New River Gorge National Park and Preserve.

This is intended to be a complete list of the properties and districts on the National Register of Historic Places in New River Gorge National Park and Preserve, West Virginia, United States.  The locations of National Register properties and districts for which the latitude and longitude coordinates are included below, may be seen in a Google map.

There are nine properties and districts listed on the National Register in the park, and one location outside the boundaries of the park, used as an administrative and interpretive site..

Current listings 

|}

See also 
 National Register of Historic Places listings in Fayette County, West Virginia
 National Register of Historic Places listings in Raleigh County, West Virginia

References 

New River Gorge